Sylvia Sarita Flores ( – 8 December 2022) was a Belizean politician and educator. She was the first woman to be speaker of the House of Representatives and to be acting prime minister of Belize.

Early life
The daughter of Evelyn Avila and Santos Flores, she was born in Dangriga and was raised by her stepfather Bernard Rhys. She taught Spanish in high school in Dangriga. She went on to earn a BA in economics and political science from Hunter College in New York City. She returned to Belize and, in 1983, was named a justice of the peace. In 1988, Flores became the first woman mayor of Dangriga, serving two terms.

Career
Flores was the Speaker of the House of Representatives from 1998 to 2001, and was President of the Senate from 2001 to 2003. In 2003, Flores was elected as representative for Dangriga; she was named Minister of Defence and National Emergency Management. In 2005, she was named Minister of Human Development and Women. After retiring from politics, she returned to teaching.

In 2013, she was named Woman of the Year by the United States Embassy in Belize.

Personal life and death
Flores suffered from diabetes, and her health deteriorated further after a stroke. She died on 8 December 2022, at the age of 71.

References 

1950s births
Year of birth missing
2022 deaths
People's United Party politicians
Defence ministers of Belize
Government ministers of Belize
Speakers of the House of Representatives (Belize)
Members of the Belize House of Representatives for Dangriga
Members of the Senate (Belize)
Women mayors of places in Belize
Female defence ministers
20th-century Belizean politicians
20th-century Belizean women politicians
21st-century Belizean politicians
21st-century Belizean women politicians
Mayors of places in Belize